Chloroclystis ericinellae is a moth in the family Geometridae. It is endemic to Tanzania.

References

External links

Moths described in 1910
ericinellae
Endemic fauna of Tanzania